Urban transports of Seville Municipal Corporation (TUSSAM) manages the bus service and urban trams in Seville, Spain.

History 

TUSSAM was founded on November 10, 1975 from a split in the Servicio Municipal de Transportes Urbanos (SMTU).

Operations 

TUSSAM consists of a network of 41 lines; 4 concessional lines (managed by the company Casal SL); 8 night lines; 2 special lines that only provide service during April; as well as a tram line. Overall, the service covers close to 300 kilometers and transports around 90 million people each year.

As of December 31, 2010, TUSSAM owned a total of 374 vehicles. The fleet composition is as follows:

By fuel 
 56.96% (213): Biodiesel
 41.44% (155): Compressed natural gas 
 0.53% (2): Bioethanol
 1.07% (4):  Electric

By dimension 
 72.73% (272): Standard bus (12 meters)
 23.26% (87): Articulated bus (18 meters)
 2.14% (8): Midibus (8 meters)
 1.87% (7): Minibus (7 meters)

By vehicle accessibility 
 70.32% (263): Low floor with automatic ramp
 28.88% (108): Low floor with automatic and manual ramp
 0.80% (3): Low floor without ramp

Lines 

1: Polígono Norte - Hospital Virgen Rocío

2: Barqueta - Heliópolis

3: Pino Montano - Bellavista

5: Torre Sevilla - Santa Aurelia

6: San Lázaro - Heliópolis

10: Plaza Ponce de León - San Jerónimo

11: Plaza Ponce de León - Los Príncipes

12: Plaza Ponce de León - Pino Montano

13: Plaza del Duque - Pino Montano

14: Plaza del Duque - Polígono Norte

15: Plaza Jerónimo de Córdoba - San Diego

16: Plaza Jerónimo de Córdoba - Valdezorras

(Service managed by Casal S.L.)

20: Plaza Ponce de León - Polígono San Pablo

21: Plaza de Armas - Polígono San Pablo

22: Prado San Sebastián - Sevilla Este

24: Plaza Ponce de León - La Negrilla

25: Prado San Sebastián - Rochelambert

26: Prado San Sebastián - Cerro del Águila

27: Plaza del Duque - Sevilla Este

28: Prado San Sebastián - Parque Alcosa

29: Prado San Sebastián - Torreblanca

(Service managed by Casal S.L.)

30: Prado San Sebastián - La Paz

31: Prado San Sebastián - Polígono Sur

32: Plaza del Duque - Polígono Sur

34: Prado San Sebastián - Los Bermejales

35: Prado San Sebastián - Palmas Altas

37: Puerta Jerez - Bellavista

38: Prado San Sebastián - UPO

39: Los Arcos - Palmete

(Service managed by Casal S.L.)

40: Marqués de Paradas - El Tardón

41: Marqués de Paradas - Tablada

43: Reyes Católicos - El Tardón

52: San Bernardo - Palmete

53: Los Arcos - Centro Penitenciario

B3: Nervión - Santa Clara

B4: San Bernardo - Torreblanca

EA: Prado San Sebastián - Aeropuerto

LE: Prado San Sebastián - Sevilla Este

LN: Prado San Sebastián - Pino Montano

LS: Santa Justa - Bellavista

T1: Plaza Nueva - San Bernando

C1/C2: Cartuja - Prado San Sebastián

C3/C4: Barqueta/Plaza de Armas - Prado San Sebastián

C6: San Jerónimo - Gordillo

(Service managed by Casal S.L.)

Night lines:

A1: Prado San Sebastián - Pino Montano - Polígono Norte

A2: Prado San Sebastián - San Jerónimo

A3: Prado San Sebastián - Sevilla Este

A4: Prado San Sebastián - Santa Aurelia - Palmete - Rochelambert

A5: Prado San Sebastián - Cerro del Águila - Polígono Sur

A6: Prado San Sebastián - Los Bermejales - Bellavista

A7: Prado San Sebastián - Los Remedios - Triana - Plaza del Duque

A8: Prado San Sebastián - Polígono San Pablo - Parque Alcosa

References

Transport in Seville